Muzaffar Iqbāl (born December 3, 1954 in Lahore, Punjab, Pakistan) is a Pakistani-Canadian Islamic scholar and author.

Career
Currently, Dr. Iqbal is the President of Center for Islamic Sciences, Canada. Between 1992-1996, Iqbal worked as Director (Scientific Information) COMSTECH, the Ministerial Standing Committee on Scientific and Technological Cooperation of the OIC (Organization of Islamic Cooperation). From 1996-1998, he served as Director (Scientific Cooperation) of Pakistan Academy of Sciences. Between 1999 and 2002, he was the Director of Science and Religion course program of the Center for Theology and Natural Sciences (CTNS), Berkeley, a research center of the Graduate Theological Union. In 2000, Dr. Iqbal established the Center for Islam and Science, Alberta, Canada, (renamed Center for Islamic Sciences in 2013). In 2009, he initiated a project to produce the first English language encyclopedia of the Qur'an exclusively based on primary Islamic sources, The Integrated Encyclopedia of the Qur'an (IEQ). The first volume was published in 2013; in 2020, the project was reconfigured to become an online encyclopedia. Iqbal is editor of a journal of Islamic perspectives on science and civilization, Islamic sciences (formerly, Islam & Science).

Iqbal's published works are on Islam, Sufism, Muslims and their relationship with modernity.

Iqbal appeared on PBS's Ask the Experts in 2003, discussing "Can We Believe in Both Science and Religion?"
In another show in 2003, he joined a panel to discuss "Can Religion Withstand Technology?"

In an article on Islamic science, the New York Times quoted Iqbal as explaining that modern science did not claim to address the purpose of life, whereas in the Islamic intellectual tradition, the question of purpose was integral to the quest for knowledge.

Iqbal was one of the experts called on by the Physics and Cosmology Group of the Center for Theology and the Natural Sciences, alongside scientists including Andrei Linde of Stanford University, John Polkinghorne of Cambridge University, Paul Davies of Macquarie University and Charles Townes of the University of California, Berkeley. Between 1996 and 2003, the group conducted an intensive public dialogue on science and spirituality.

Reception
Roxanne D. Marcotte, reviewing Iqbal's Islam and Science, published in 2002, wrote that it "presents an articulate and concise historical introduction to intellectual developments that have shaped Islamic civilization, both religious
and scientific."

The first volume of the Integrated Encyclopedia of the Qur'an has been described by Andrew Rippin  as "sumptuous and carefully produced," "an impressive beginning", and "a considerable contribution to the study of the Qur'an".

Publications
Iqbal has written, edited, and translated twenty-three books. He is the General Editor of the Integrated Encyclopedia of the Qur’an, the first English-language reference work on the Qur’an exclusively based on fourteen centuries of Muslim scholarship. He is also the Series Editor for Ashgate's Islam and Science: Historic and Contemporary Perspectives, a four-volume edited work that brings together the most important and influential articles on various aspects of the relationship between Islam and science from the beginning of the twentieth century to the present. He has authored twenty-one books and over one hundred articles covering three broad areas within the framework of Muslim encounter with modernity: the impact of this encounter on Muslim understanding of their own spiritual and intellectual traditions, the role of modern science and technology in the reshaping of the Muslim Ummah, and Qur’anic studies, including Western academic studies on the Qur’an. His books and articles have been translated into Persian, Bahasa Indonesia, Albanian, and Korean.

In Urdu
 Muzaffar Iqbal. Jang-e Azadi Sey Hasooley Azadi Tak. Lahore: Sang-e-Meel Publishers, 1977. A book on the history of the Pakistan Movement. In Urdu.
 Muzaffar Iqbal. Inkhila (Uprooting). Book I of the fiction trilogy Hijratayn (Exiles). Lahore: The Circle, 1988. In Urdu.
 Muzaffar Iqbal. Inqta (Severance). Book II of the fiction trilogy Hijratayn (Exiles). Islamabad: Leo Books, 1994. In Urdu.
 Muzaffar Iqbal. Herman Melville: Life and Works. Serialized in Savera (1995-1998).

In English
 Muzaffar Iqbal. Abdullah Hussein: From Sad Generations to a Lonely Tiger. South Asian Centre, University of Wisconsin-Madison, 1985. Repr. as Abdullah Hussein: The Chronicler of Sad Generations. Islamabad: Leo Books, 1993.
 Muzaffar Iqbal and Zafar Ishaq Ansari (Translators). Towards Understanding the Qur'an. Vol. VII. Islamic Foundation, 2001. English translation of Syed Abul Ala Mawdudi's Tafhim al-Qur'an.
 Muzaffar Iqbal. Islam and Science. Aldershot: Ashgate, 2002. Reprinted in the Routledge Revivals series 2017; reprinted in Pakistan as Islam and Science: Explorations in the Fundamental Questions of the Islam and Science Discourse. Lahore: Suheyl Academy, 2004. Persian Translation, Astana Quds, Mashhad, 2010.
 Muzaffar Iqbal. Science and Islam. Greenwood Press, 2007. Repr. with Afterword as The Making of Islamic Science. Islamic Book Trust, 2009.
 Muzaffar Iqbal. Islam, Science, Muslims, and Technology: Seyyed Hossein Nasr in Conversation with Muzaffar Iqbal. Islamic Book Trust, 2007. Repr. Sherwood Park: al-Qalam Publishing, 2007; Tehran: Institute for Humanities and Cultural Studies, 2008; Islamabad: Dost Publications, 2009.
 Muzaffar Iqbal. Dew on Sunburnt Roses and other Quantum Notes. Dost Publications, 2008.
 Muzaffar Iqbal. Dawn in Madinah: A Pilgrim's Passage. Islamic Book Trust, 2008. Repr. Dost Publications, 2009.

Books edited by Iqbal (Literature, English)
 Colours of Loneliness: An anthology of Pakistani Literature, Oxford University Press, 1999.
 Pakistani Literature (ed.) vol. 1, 2 and 4, Pakistan Academy of Letters, Islamabad 1992-93.
 Islam and Science: Historic and Contemporary Perspectives, 4 vols., Aldershot: Ashgate, 2011, reprinted by Routledge, 2018.

References

External links
 at the Center for Islamic Sciences, Canada
 Journal of Qur'an and Science: Professor Muzaffar Iqbal
 at the Research Center for Islamic Legislative and Ethics

1954 births
Living people
Canadian Muslims
Canadian people of Pakistani descent
Fellows of the International Society for Complexity, Information, and Design
Historians of science
Intelligent design advocates
Members of the International Society for Science and Religion
Muslim creationists
Pakistani Muslim scholars of Islam
Scientists from Lahore
Sufi poets
University of Saskatchewan alumni
University of the Punjab alumni